Los Toldos (Sometimes referred to as General Viamonte) is a small town in Buenos Aires Province, Argentina, situated in General Viamonte Partido, which developed around a station of the same name on the Buenos Aires Western Railway.

It is most famous as the birthplace of Argentine First Lady Eva Perón in 1919.

The town of Los Toldos is home to an Indigenous Mapuche colony.

Tourist attractions 

Parque Balneario Municipal (Municipal Balneario Park)
 Carnaval de Los Toldos
Laguna La Azotea or Rehue
 La Casa de María Eva Duarte de Perón (María Eva Duarte de Perón's House)
Monasterio Benedictino Santa María (Benedictine Monastery of St Mary)
Monumento al Indio (Indian Monument)
Plaza Bernardino Rivadavia (Bernardino Rivadavia Square)
Iglesia Nuestra Señora del Pilar (Nuestra Señora del Pilar Church)
Monasterio Hermanas de la Santa Cruz (Hermanas de la Santa Cruz Monastery)
Museo de Artes e Historia de Los Toldos (Los Toldos Museum of Art and History)
Aeroclub General Viamonte
Vivero Escuela de Educación Especial Nº 501

External links 
 Official Government Website of General Viamonte Partido
 Información de la ciudad de Los Toldos (Information about the town of Los Toldos)
 Museo Municipal Casa Natal María Eva Duarte de Perón en Los Toldos (María Eva Duarte de Perón's Birthplace and Ancestral Home Municipal Museum in Los Toldos)

Populated places in Buenos Aires Province